Congress Park could refer to:
Canfield Casino and Congress Park, in Saratoga Springs, New York
Congress Park, Denver, a neighborhood in Denver, Colorado
Congress Park (Metra), a train station in Brookfield, Illinois
a park in Gothenburg, Sweden